Michel Borges de Jesus (born 23 December 1999), known as Michel, is a Brazilian footballer who plays as a midfielder for Villa Nova A.C MG, on loan from Cruzeiro.

External links 

 

1999 births
Living people
Brazilian footballers
Cruzeiro Esporte Clube players
Association football midfielders